ADAM Architecture is a UK based, international architecture and urban design practice with offices in Winchester and London. It specialises in contemporary traditional and classical design, commonly known as New Classical Architecture.

Work includes new town and country homes; restoration, and alterations to listed and historic buildings; master planning, and urban extensions.

Dan Cruickshank is a historic building consultant.

History

The practice was founded in 1992 by Robert Adam as Robert Adam Architects. He retired from the firm in 2020, and it is run in 2022 by Nigel Anderson, Hugh Petter, George Saumarez Smith, Robbie Kerr, Darren Price and Robert Cox.

Notable projects
Nansledan, for the Duchy of Cornwall
 Chettle House restoration, (2020)
 Portico at The Oval, (2013)
Millennium Gate Atlanta, (2008)
Stocks House renovation, (2008)
RAF Bentley Priory restoration and redevelopment, (2013)
 British School at Rome gallery and lecture theatre, (2002)
 Poundbury residential and commercial buildings

References

External links
 
ADAM Architecture official website

Architecture firms of England
British neoclassical architects
New Classical architects